Seraph Bay is an open bay about 15 nautical miles (28 km) wide, formed at the southeast end of Thurston Island. It is bounded by Cape Annawan on the northwest, Abbot Ice Shelf on the southwest and Dustin Island on the southeast. It was discovered by members of the United States Antarctic Service in flights from the ship Bear in February 1940. The bay was more accurately delineated by the U.S. Navy Bellingshausen Sea Expedition in February 1960. It was named by the Advisory Committee on Antarctic Names for the brig Seraph of Stonington, CT, which in 1830, under Captain Benjamin Pendleton, sailed westward from the South Shetland Islands, reaching as far as 101W, south of 60S.

Maps 
 Thurston Island – Jones Mountains. 1:500000 Antarctica Sketch Map. US Geological Survey, 1967.
 Antarctic Digital Database (ADD). Scale 1:250000 topographic map of Antarctica. Scientific Committee on Antarctic Research (SCAR), 1993–2016.

Further reading 
 Defense Mapping Agency  1992, Sailing Directions (planning Guide) and (enroute) for Antarctica, P 379
 United States. Defense Mapping Agency. Hydrographic Center, Sailing Directions for Antarctica: Includes Islands South of Latitude 60°, P 210

External links 

 Seraph Bay on USGS website
 Seraph Bay on AADC website
 Seraph Bay on SCAR website
 Seraph Bay on marineregions.org

References 

Bays of Ellsworth Land
Thurston Island